Philip Botström, (born 1990 in Colombia) was the president of the Swedish Social Democratic Youth League (SSU) from the congress on 9 August 2015 until the congress on 1 August 2021. Botström grew up in Filipstad, Sweden. As president Botström is representing SSU in the party board and the executive board of the Swedish Social Democratic Party.

Philip Botström has expressed that the political goal for his presidency is to make increased equality the main focus in Swedish politics. Investments in infrastructure, schools and an improved situation for young people in the labour market is part of the policy agenda to reach this.

References

1990 births
Living people
Swedish Social Democratic Party politicians
Colombian emigrants to Sweden
21st-century Swedish politicians